Vikramaditya Singh (1517 – 1536) was the Maharana of Mewar Kingdom (r. 1531 – 1536). He was a Sisodia Rajput and son of Rana Sanga and the elder brother of Udai Singh II. He was defeated by the Gujarat Sultanate and was unpopular with the nobles of Mewar because of his short-temper. Chittor was sacked by Bahadur Shah of Gujarat in 1535 during his reign.

Murder of Vikramaditya

Vikramaditya's temperament had not improved even after the defeat in 1535 and, one day in 1536, he physically abused a respected old chieftain at the Court. This led the Mewar nobles to place Vikramaditya under palace arrest, leaving the object of Panna Dhai's love and loyalty, Udai Singh as heir-elect to the throne. Vanvir Singh sought and turned Vikramaditya's soldiers against him. Vanvir killed Vikramaditya and attempted to  murder Uday Singh. He was, allegedly, the illegitimate son of Udai Singh's uncle, Prithviraj. Vanvir, who considered himself to be the rightful heir to the throne. One evening that 1537 (some books meantion in 1536 as well), he conducted a festival called the "Deepdan" and used it to his full advantage. While the whole kingdom was celebrating the festival, he found this the right time and assassinated the imprisoned Vikramaditya, then hurried towards the rawala to get rid of the only remaining barrier to his ambition, the 14-year-old Maharana-elect, Udai Singh, in which he failed due to Panna Dai's alertness, patriotism and loyalty.

References 

Mewar dynasty
1517 births
1537 deaths